Johan de Graeff, also Jan de Graeff (29 October 1673 in Amsterdam – 12 April 1714) - patrician of Amsterdam, Lord of the Free and high fief of Zuid-Polsbroek - was a member of the De Graeff - family from the Dutch Golden Age. His political Position was that of the Dutch States Party.

Life
Johan was the oldest son of Pieter de Graeff and Jacoba Bicker, sister of Wendela Bicker, who was married to Grand Pensionary Johan de Witt. He was given his first name Johan in memory of De Witt, who was murdered in Rampjaar 1672. His elder brother was Cornelis de Graeff II. who became Lord of Purmerland and Ilpendam, his younger sister Agneta de Graeff was married to Jan Baptiste de Hochepied, who lives in a City-Place in The Hague today called Kabinet der Koningin.

After his studies at the University of Leiden in the year 1699, he became an advisor and from 1709 to 1714 a member of the vroedschap of the City of Amsterdam.

De Graeff residence at the Herengracht in a house now called Tassenmuseum Hendrikje, at castle Ilpenstein and at Bronstee, a Countryhouse near Heemstede.

In the year 1709 Johan married Johanna Hooft, they had five children: 
 Jacoba Adriana de Graeff (1710–1745), married to Mr Jacob Jan de Blocq van Kuffeler, deputy of Frisia 
 Gerrit de Graeff I (1711–1752), married to Maria Elisabeth Sautijn and later with Elisabeth Lestevenon; Gerrit succeeded him as Lord of Zuid-Polsbroek
 Alida Joanna de Graeff (1713–1757), married with Mr François de Witt, burgomaster of Amsterdam

Johan de Graeff has a big art collection including paintings from Rembrandt van Rijn, Gerard Ter Borch and Jacob van Ruisdael. The collection know three very  famous pictures, Catharina Hooft with her Nurse, painted by Frans Hals, Jacob Blessing the Sons of Joseph and Portrait of Andries de Graeff, both from Rembrandt.

Art collection

Noble title

References

Literature
 Graeff, P. de (P. de Graeff Gerritsz en Dirk de Graeff van Polsbroek) Genealogie van de familie De Graeff van Polsbroek, Amsterdam 1882.
 Bruijn, J. H. de Genealogie van het geslacht De Graeff van Polsbroek 1529/1827, met bijlagen. De Built 1962-63.
 Moelker, H.P. De heerlijkheid Purmerland en Ilpendam (1978 Purmerend)

External links
 Johan de Graeffs Biography at the "DBNL", part II (dutch)

Johan, Graeff de
Nobility from Amsterdam
Lords of Zuid-Polsbroek
1673 births
1714 deaths